The 1995 Styrian Open was a women's tennis tournament played on outdoor clay courts at the Sportpark Piberstein in Maria Lankowitz, Austria that was part of Tier IV of the 1995 WTA Tour. It was the 23rd edition of the tournament and was held from 24 July until 30 July 1995. First-seeded Judith Wiesner won the singles title and earned $17,500 first-prize money.

Finals

Singles

 Judith Wiesner defeated  Ruxandra Dragomir 7–6, 6–3
 It was Wiesner's only singles title of the year and the 5th of her career.

Doubles

 Silvia Farina /  Andrea Temesvári defeated  Alexandra Fusai /  Wiltrud Probst 6–2, 6–2
 It was Farina's only title of the year and the 1st of her career. It was Temesvári's only title of the year and the 11th of her career.

External links
 ITF tournament edition details
 Tournament draws

Styrian Open
WTA Austrian Open
1995 in Austrian women's sport
WTA